{{DISPLAYTITLE:C18H16O4}}
The molecular formula C18H16O4 may refer to:

 Truxillic acid, several crystalline stereoisomeric cyclic dicarboxylic acids
 Truxinic acid, several stereoisomeric cyclic dicarboxylic acids with the formula